Aizkraukle Parish is an administrative unit of Aizkraukle Municipality in the Vidzeme region of Latvia.

Parishes of Latvia
Aizkraukle Municipality
Vidzeme